Matthew Grayling (born 27 September 1963) is a New Zealand equestrian. He competed in eventing at the 2004 Summer Olympics in Athens.

References

1963 births
Living people
New Zealand male equestrians
Olympic equestrians of New Zealand
Equestrians at the 2004 Summer Olympics